Franz Gregor Ignaz Eckstein (c. 1689, Židovice – 1741, Lviv) was an Austrian fresco painter of Czech ancestry, who worked in Bohemia, Silesia, and Galicia.

Life and work
He may also have studied in Rome. His first frescoes were modelled on the complex works of the Italian master, Andrea Pozzo. In addition to frescoes, he painted altarpieces.

In 1711, he was married in Brünn, where he took up residence, although he accepted commissions from many other places, and travelled frequently. From 1727 to 1733, he lived and worked in Krakau. His final two years were spent in Lemberg.

The painter and engraver Gottfried Bernhard Göz was one of his best known students.

Sources
 Anna Lewicka-Morawska, Marek Machowski, Maria Anna Rudzka: Słownik malarzy polskich. Warszawa, Wydawnictwo Arkady, 2003, 
 Helena Lukešová: František Řehoř Ignác Eckstein (1689?–1741), K východiskům jeho freskařsé tvorby, Master's thesis, Brno, 2009 (Online)

External links

Encyklopedia PWN (Polish)
Encyklopedie Brna (Czech)

1680s births
1741 deaths
Year of birth uncertain

Czech painters
Austro-Hungarian artists
Religious artists
Fresco painters
People from Louny District